Dan Mazeau is an American screenwriter. He was born and raised in Santa Rosa, California and majored in physics at the University of California, Berkeley. He then enrolled in the MFA screenwriting program at the University of California, Los Angeles (UCLA). He is also a graduate of the Professional Program in Screenwriting at the UCLA School of Theater, Film and Television.  There he wrote a family fantasy "The Land of Lost Things" and the script was set up at Nickelodeon/Paramount Pictures, with Arnold Kopelson producing. Hired by Dan Lin and Warner Bros. to adapt Jonny Quest, he was named one of Variety's "10 Screenwriters to Watch" in 2008 and the script was on the Blacklist that same year.

Career
Mazeau has also wrote a script for a Jonny Quest adaptation. He has also been attached to write a script for Bleach, based on the popular manga.

By January 2009, Mazeau was hired by Warner Brothers to write a script for The Flash after previous iterations by David S. Goyer, Shawn Levy, David Dobkin and Craig Wright failed to get off the ground. In April 2018, Mazeau was revealed to have contributed to a draft of the film, titled Flashpoint.

Mazeau is currently adapting Japanese author Chohei Kambayashi's alien invasion novel Yukikaze for Warner Bros. Pictures, with Tom Cruise slated to star.

Mazeau has also been hired to rewrite an action film entitled World's Most Wanted with Vin Diesel currently attached.

Filmography
 Wrath of the Titans (2012)
 Damsel (2023)
 Fast X (2023)

References

External links
 

21st-century American screenwriters
American male screenwriters
Living people
Year of birth missing (living people)
University of California, Berkeley alumni
UCLA Film School alumni
Screenwriters from California
Writers from Santa Rosa, California
21st-century American male writers